The England cricket team played a One Day International (ODI) match against Scotland on 9 May 2014 as a warm-up for their series against Sri Lanka and India later in the summer of 2014. The match was played at Mannofield Park in Aberdeen, the 11th ODI to be played at the ground, with one match that was abandoned. England won the game by 39 runs. After the match, England captain Alastair Cook said that due to the rain that the match "probably wasn't fit to play, if you are being totally honest. But just in a one-off game, with not so much riding on it, I think it was the right decision to play".

Squads

ODI series

Only ODI

References

2014
International cricket competitions in 2014
2014 in English cricket
2014 in Scottish cricket